F.C.D. Brera is an Italian football club in Milan, Lombardy, which plays in Seconda Categoria.

Colours 

Its colours are green and black.

History  
Brera Football Club was founded in 2000 by the young publisher and journalist Alessandro Aleotti. The first manager appointed was former Inter and Sampdoria goalkeeper Walter Zenga. The team played its matches in the newly reopened Arena Civica, but was relegated from Serie D. In the season 2003/2004, through a partnership with the FIGC and Carcere di Opera (one of the biggest prisons in Milan and in Italy), Brera founded FreeOpera Brera, a team composed of detainees. Allowed to take part to 2003/2004 Terza Categoria, the team won the championship and was promoted to Seconda Categoria. The initiative obtained a lot of praise and RAI talked about it in a "Sfide" episode. In the season 2006/2007 Brera, under the leading of coach Noureddine Zekri, obtained its first promotion, beating Bresso in the playoff and gaining the right to take part to Promozione the following season. In the season 2011/2012, after temporarily ceasing the first team's activity, Brera took part to the Torneo di Viareggio under the name of Brera Emergence Gabon, a team composed of young Gabonian footballers. In the season 2014/2015 the team, with Andrea Mazza appointed as coach, won its first championship, getting promoted from Seconda Categoria to Prima Categoria. In January 2016, in collaboration with the Serbian Roma actress and activist Dijana Pavlovic, Brera started managing the Romani People football team.
From 2016/2017 Brera played in Eccellenza and Enzo Gambaro has been appointed as new coach. Due to a poor beginning of season, in October 2016 Enzo Gambaro has resigned and has been replaced with former Brera  manager Andrea Mazza. The season ended with the team's relegation and Andrea Mazza's resignment. In July Andrea Valle was appointed as new coach. The 2017/2018 season saw some changes on the roster side, as it was mostly composed by young foreign players: the adaption to the league was hard and, despite some outstanding performances, the team eventually got relegated. In August 2018 Marco Resca was appointed as new coach of the team now facing the Prima Categoria division. After a promising start, the team went through some tough time and in March, after Resca's resignation, former AS Roma defender Amedeo Mangone came in as new coach and led the team so a smooth season ending. The following season, with former Brera legend Marco Nichetti in charge of the team, was affected by the COVID-19 pandemic, which suspended the ongoing championship. In September 2020 Amedeo Mangone agreed on resuming his activity as Brera head coach.

Notable managers 
  Noureddine Zekri
  Enzo Gambaro
  Andrea Mazza
  Marco Nichetti
  Marco Nicoletti
  Walter Zenga
  Amedeo Mangone

Notable players 
 Dario Drudi
 Sergio D'Autilia
 Guido Corteggiano
 Andrea Merenda
 Martín Belforti
 José Belforti
 Maximiliano Martinez

External links 
 Official Website

References 

 
Football clubs in Milan
Football clubs in Italy
Association football clubs established in 2000
2000 establishments in Italy